Emily Shearman (born 23 February 1999) is a New Zealand racing cyclist. She represented her country at the 2022 Commonwealth Games, winning a silver medal in the team pursuit.

She competed at the 2019/2020 World Cup, and 2019/2020 Oceania Championships.

References

External links
 
 

Living people
1999 births
New Zealand female cyclists
Commonwealth Games silver medallists for New Zealand
Commonwealth Games medallists in cycling
Cyclists at the 2022 Commonwealth Games
Sportspeople from Palmerston North
Medallists at the 2022 Commonwealth Games